Into the Slave Nebula is a science fiction novel written by John Brunner and first published in 1968. It is a revised version of Slavers of Space (1960).

Plot summary

Earth is a stable, prosperous, hedonistic society. The death of an android by brutal murder shocks Derry Horn, and he undertakes a dangerous interstellar mission. He is imprisoned by ruthless slavers and discovers the origin of the androids.

References
Brunner, John (1968). Into the Slave Nebula. Lancer Books, NY.

External links 

1968 British novels
1968 science fiction novels
Novels by John Brunner
Lancer Books books